The pubs and inns in Buxton are an important part of the historical character of the town of Buxton, Derbyshire, in England. The inns date back to the 16th century and several are listed buildings. Most are within the Conservation Areas of Higher Buxton, Central Buxton and Fairfield.

Pubs and inns by district

Higher Buxton

Central Buxton

Fairfield

Burbage

Harpur Hill and South Buxton

Pubs of the past 

There are also historical records of other public houses: the Cheshire Cheese (on Macclesfield Old Road in 1842), the Fountain (on High Street in 1850s), the Fox and Hounds (on West Road), the Hatton and Holden, the Masons Arms (in 1811), the Oddfellows Arms (on High Street in 1864), the Red Lion (on Holmfield in Burbage in 1842) and the White Horse (in 1790).

References 

Buildings and structures in Buxton
Buxton
History of Derbyshire